The 2018–19 FC Midtjylland season is FC Midtjylland's 20th season of existence, and their 18th consecutive season in the Danish Superliga, the top tier of football in Denmark. In addition to a second place finish in the Superliga, Midtjylland won its first Danish Cup and competed in the UEFA Champions League qualifying rounds.

Squad

Transfers and loans

Arrivals

Summer

Winter

Loan in

Departures

Summer

Winter

Loan out

Non-competitive

Pre-season Friendlies

Competitive

Competition record

Danish Superliga

Regular season

Matches

Championship round

Matches

Danish Cup

UEFA Champions League

Second qualifying round

UEFA Europa League

Third qualifying round

Play-off round

Statistics

Appearances 

This includes all competitive matches.

Goalscorers 

This includes all competitive matches.

Assists 

This includes all competitive matches.

Clean Sheets 

This includes all competitive matches.

Disciplinary record 

This includes all competitive matches.

Suspensions 

This includes all competitive matches.

Awards

Team

Individual

References

External links 
 FC Midtjylland in Danish

FC Midtjylland seasons
Danish football clubs 2018–19 season
Midtjylland